Daniel M. Kelly (February 6, 1915 – October 26, 1982) was an American politician who served in the New York State Assembly from 1951 to 1968.

He died on October 26, 1982, in Manhattan, New York City, New York at age 67.

References

1915 births
1982 deaths
Democratic Party members of the New York State Assembly
20th-century American politicians